David Patrick Joyce (born March 17, 1957) is an American politician and attorney who has served as the United States representative for Ohio's 14th congressional district since 2013. A member of the Republican Party, Joyce was previously the prosecutor of Geauga County, Ohio. He chairs the Republican Governance Group.

Early life and education
Joyce was born in Cleveland, Ohio, to an Irish Catholic family. His father was a coal salesman. In high school, he played football, and considered joining the priesthood. In 1975, Joyce enrolled at the University of Dayton, a Catholic university, from which he received a Bachelor of Science degree in accounting in 1979, and later his Juris Doctor.

Legal career
From 1983 to 1984, Joyce was a public defender for Cuyahoga County, and from 1985 to 1988 a public defender for Geauga County. In 1989, he was hired as an assistant county attorney in Lake County. He assisted County Prosecutor Steven C. LaTourette in prosecuting serial murderer and cult leader Jeffrey Lundgren for the Kirtland cult killings.

By 2012, Joyce had been appointed prosecutor of Geauga County. He prosecuted the Chardon High School shooting of six students that took place on February 27, 2012. The defendant, Thomas "T.J." Lane, 17 years old at the time of the crime, was charged as an adult with three counts of aggravated murder, two counts of aggravated attempted murder, and one count of felonious assault. He pleaded guilty and was sentenced in 2013 to three life sentences without parole.

U.S. House of Representatives

Elections

2012

In July 2012, Representative Steve LaTourette of Ohio's 14th congressional district announced that he would retire in 2012 rather than seek reelection. Because LaTourette announced his retirement after the primary, local Republican party leaders chose Joyce as the replacement nominee.

Joyce ran in the November general election against Democratic nominee Dale Virgil Blanchard, Libertarian David Macko and Green Party nominee Elaine Mastromatteo. He won with 54% of the vote.

2014

In February 2013, Roll Call reported that Steve Israel, head of the Democratic Congressional Campaign Committee, had identified the 14th congressional district as one of the party's top four targets in 2014. The House Majority PAC made Joyce one of its top targets to oust in the 2014 elections.

In 2014, according to one news source, Joyce "survived a grueling primary against a Tea Party-backed candidate" before facing "an equally tough challenge from Michael Wager." Joyce won with 63.3% of the vote to Wager's 33% and independent David Macko's 3.7%.

2016

Joyce defeated Wager again, 62.6% to 37.4%.

2018

In April 2017, Betsy Rader, a Democrat, announced that she would run against Joyce in 2018. She is a lawyer who represents victims of employment discrimination. Rader said she supported "much" of the Affordable Care Act, but that she needed to study health care more as an issue. She criticized Joyce for opposing an increase in the minimum wage and for wanting to defund Planned Parenthood.

In October 2017, Darrell Scott, a pastor involved in President Donald Trump's political operation, and who served as CEO of the semi-official "National Diversity Coalition for Trump" organized by Trump's attorney Michael Cohen, said he would consider a primary challenge to Joyce.

Tenure 
Asked about his legislative priorities in March 2016, Joyce cited terrorist threats, job growth, government spending, the national debt, environmental protection of the Great Lakes, and health care.

The Lugar Center and the McCourt School of Public Policy ranked Joyce the 29th most bipartisan member of the House of Representatives during the 114th United States Congress and the most bipartisan member of the House from Ohio.

In July 2017, Joyce said that U.S. political discourse had reached a "vitriolic" level. "I do know there's a level of frustration out there," he said. "But we need to work together. [President Donald Trump] has gotten into this tug-of-war with the national media. Now we're six months into his presidency ... and infrastructure improvements, tax changes and healthcare law are not getting covered. They are dealing with the tweet du Jour ... and [Trump's tweets] certainly don't help."

Joyce is a member of the Republican Main Street Partnership, United States Congressional International Conservation Caucus, Veterinary Medicine Caucus, and the Climate Solutions Caucus. He co-chairs the Congressional Cannabis Caucus.

During Donald Trump's presidency, Joyce voted in line with Trump's stated position 91.8% of the time. As of September 2021, Joyce had voted in line with Joe Biden's stated position 30.6% of the time.

Committee assignments 
 Committee on Appropriations
Subcommittee on Interior, Environment, and Related Agencies (Ranking Member)
Subcommittee on Financial Services and General Government
 Committee on Ethics
 Select Committee on the Modernization of Congress

Caucus memberships 

 Republican Study Committee
 Republican Governance Group
Republican Main Street Partnership 
United States Congressional International Conservation Caucus 
Veterinary Medicine Caucus 
Climate Solutions Caucus 
Congressional Cannabis Caucus (Co-Chair)
Problem Solvers Caucus

Political positions

Health care 
Joyce opposes the Affordable Care Act (Obamacare) and has voted 31 times to repeal it. In 2017, he voted against a Republican bill to repeal the Affordable Care Act, saying it "was too partisan".

Jobs 
In August 2013, Joyce said that part of the problem with unemployment numbers in the U.S. is that employers "can't find people to come to work sober, daily, drug-free and want to learn the necessary skills going forward to be able to do those jobs."

Immigration 
In March 2016, Joyce said that he had co-sponsored "several bills that ensured refugees underwent stricter scrutiny in order to prevent a Paris-style attack from happening in the United States." He supports the Visa Waiver Program in order to "ensure terrorists with Western passports don't enter our country," for restrictions on transferring Guantanamo detainees, and for enhancements in cybersecurity infrastructure. He said, in summary, that he was "committed to giving our soldiers and our intelligence community all of the resources they need to do the job."

Joyce voted for the Further Consolidated Appropriations Act of 2020 which authorizes DHS to nearly double the available H-2B visas for the remainder of FY 2020.

Joyce voted for the Consolidated Appropriations Act (H.R. 1158), which effectively prohibits ICE from cooperating with Health and Human Services to detain or remove illegal alien sponsors of unaccompanied alien children (UACs).

Transportation 
In 2014, Joyce introduced the Safe Streets Act with Congresswoman Doris Matsui. The bill would nationalize transportation "design elements" so that streets would be designed with the safety of drivers, pedestrians, and bicyclists in mind.

Cannabis 
Joyce has supported a number of congressional efforts to reform cannabis laws. He reintroduced the Rohrabacher–Farr amendment in 2018 to prohibit the Justice Department from spending funds to interfere with the implementation of state medical cannabis laws. He also introduced the STATES Act in 2018 and 2019 to protect states from federal interference regarding both medical and recreational use. Also in 2018, Joyce cosponsored the Ending Federal Marijuana Prohibition Act. In January 2019, he was named a co-chair of the Congressional Cannabis Caucus.

In 2021, Joyce introduced the Veterans Medical Marijuana Safe Harbor Act to legalize medical cannabis for military veterans and allow Veterans Affairs doctors to prescribe the drug. Also in 2021, he introduced the Cannabis Reform for Veterans, Small Businesses, and Medical Professionals Act to remove cannabis from the Controlled Substances Act and direct federal agencies to develop regulations for cannabis similar to alcohol. In December 2021, he and Representative Alexandria Ocasio-Cortez introduced the Harnessing Opportunities by Pursuing Expungement (HOPE) Act to provide grants for state and local governments to expunge cannabis offenses.

Impeachments of Donald Trump 
Joyce voted "no" on the first impeachment of Donald Trump on charges of abuse of power and obstruction of Congress on December 18, 2019. On January 13, 2021, he voted against Trump's second impeachment for incitement of insurrection.

January 6 commission 
On May 19, 2021, Joyce was one of 35 Republicans who joined all Democrats in voting to approve legislation to establish the January 6 commission meant to investigate the storming of the U.S. Capitol.

Censure of Paul Gosar 
In November 2021, Joyce refused to vote to censure Paul Gosar, a House member who approvingly shared an animated video himself killing a fellow member and assaulting the president. Joyce voted "Present."

LGBT rights 
On July 19, 2022, Joyce and 46 other Republican representatives voted for the Respect for Marriage Act, which would codify the right to same-sex marriage in federal law.

Suspending the US Constitution
In a nationally broadcast December 2022 interview, Joyce said that, regardless of Donald Trump's calls to suspend the Constitution of the United States, he would support him for president were Trump to win the Republican nomination in 2024.

SANEs Act
In February 2022, Joyce and Representative Deborah Ross introduced the Sexual Assault Nurse Examiners (SANEs) Act, which is designed to address the nationwide shortage of Sexual Assault Nurse Examiners and improve care for survivors of sexual violence. The bill was endorsed by RAINN, the American Nurses Association, and the National Network to End Domestic Violence.

Personal life
Joyce married Kelly in 1990. They live in Russell Township with their three children. Joyce is a member of the National District Attorney Association and the Ohio Prosecuting Attorney Association. He is also director of Geauga Bluecoats Inc.

Electoral history

References

External links
 Congressman David Joyce official U.S. House website
 
 
 

|-

|-

1957 births
21st-century American politicians
County district attorneys in Ohio
Living people
People from Geauga County, Ohio
University of Dayton alumni
Republican Party members of the United States House of Representatives from Ohio
Public defenders